Coretronic Corporation (Coretronic) is a Taiwanese electronics and manufacturing company. Founded in Hsinchu Science Park on June 30, 1992, Coretronic is a manufacturer of DLP projector, interactive projection system, image signal processing box, projection module, LCD backlight module, touch module, industrial and medical LCD display in Taiwan.

History
Coretronic Corporation was founded in 1992, and that year began developing and manufacturing LCD backlight modules.
Develop and manufacture of LCD displays began in 1993. In 1995, Nano Precision was established to manufacture LGP (Light Guide Plate) for LCD backlight modules. Coretronic became a listed company on the Taipei Exchange (GTSM: 5371) in 1999.

Optoma Technology was established to run its own-brand market in 2002, and YOUNG Optics was established to manufacture optical devices. Also that year, Coretronic (Suzhou) was established to manufacture LCD backlight modules. In 2004, Nano Precision (Suzhou) was established to manufacture LGP (Light Guide Plate) for LCD backlight modules. Also, YOUNG Lighting Technology was established to manufacture optical devices. In 2005, Coretronic (Shanghai), Coretronic (Nanjing), and Coretronic (Ningbo) were established to manufacture LCD backlight modules. Also, Coretronic Projection (Kunshan) was established to manufacture projectors and related optical devices, and Young Green Energy was established to manufacture power supply units and other related electronic components.

CORE-FLEX OPTICAL (Suzhou) was established in 2006 to manufacture components for LCD modules and optical devices.  YOUNG Optics became a listed company on Taiwan Stock Exchange (TWSE: 3504). in 2007, and both Suzhou Nano Display and Coretronic (Guangzhou) were established to manufacture LCD backlight modules. 2008 saw Guangzhou Nano Display and Nano Precision (Nanjing) both established to manufacture LCD backlight modules. Coretronic Display Solution was established in 2008 as well to manufacture digital information display products and niche and medical displays.

Coretronic System Engineering was established to provide integrated imaging system products and services in 2010. Also, Coretronic Culture and Arts Foundation (CCAF) was founded, and Coretronics joint ventured with Japan's Gunze Limited to establish YLG Optotech Limited to manufacture capacitive touch panels. 2011 saw Coretronic Venture Capital established to make investments. Young Lighting, Nano Precision, and Coretronic Display Solution were merged into Young Lighting in 2012, and in 2014, Coretronic Display (Suzhou) was established to consistently produce customized LCD module products.

Coretronic Optotech (Suzhou) was established in 2015 to manufacture LCD backlight modules, LCD TVs, and new flat panel displays. Coretronic was honored 2015 Innovative Product Awards from Hsinchu Science Park Bureau, Ministry of Science and Technology. Coretronic has been honorably ranked in the top 5% in the Corporate Governance Evaluation from Taiwan Stock Exchange (TWSE) for the 2nd consecutive year in 2016. Coretronic was also honored at the 2016 Innovative Product Awards from Hsinchu Science Park Bureau, Ministry of Science and Technology.

WaveOptics partnered with Coretronic on an AR developer program in 2018. Also, Coretronic ranked in the top 5% in the Corporate Governance Evaluation from the Taiwan Stock Exchange (TWSE) for the 4th consecutive year in 2018, and Nano Precision Taiwan Limited was established. Both Coretronic MEMS Corp. and Coretronic Reality Incorporation (CRI) were established in 2019. Coretronic Vietnam Company Limited was founded in 2020, and Coretronic Intelligent Logistics Solutions Corporation (CiLS) was established in 2021.

Shareholding and subsidiaries
Coretronic Corporation
Young Optics Incorporation
Optoma Technology Corporation
Young Green Energy Corporation
uCare Medical Electronics Corporation
Champ Vision Display Incorporation
Calibre UK Limited
Coretronic Intelligent Cloud Service Corporation
Coretronic Intelligent Robotics Corporation
InnoSpectra Corporaiton
Coretronic MEMS Corporation
Coretronic Intelligent Logistics Solutions Corporation
Coretronic Culture and Arts Foundation

See also
 List of companies of Taiwan
 List of semiconductor fabrication plants

References

External links
Coretronic Facebook Fanpage
Coretronic 2021 Annual Report
Coretronic 2021 ESG Repport
Coretronic 2021 ESG Insight

1992 establishments in Taiwan
Manufacturing companies based in Hsinchu
Electronics companies of Taiwan
Technology companies established in 1992
Taiwanese brands